The 2011 CHIO Aachen was the 2011 edition of the CHIO Aachen, the German official horse show in five horse sport disciplines (show jumping, dressage, eventing, four-in-hand-driving and vaulting).

In 2011 the event was also the FEI selected 2012 Olympic Qualification for Central and Eastern Europe, Asia and Oceania in show jumping.

Introduction 
The 2011 CHIO Aachen is held as CSIO 5* (show jumping), CDIO 5* (dressage), CICO 3* (eventing), CAIO (four-in-hand-driving) and CVIO 2* (vaulting). It  Olympic Qualification is held as CSI 2*. The event is held between July 8, 2011 and July 17, 2011.

The CHIO Aachen is in show jumping and dressage the most prestigious horse show in Europe. It is also called "Weltfest der Pferdesports" (World Equestrian Festival). The competitions are held at different places at the Soers in Aachen. The show jumping competitions are held in the "Hauptstadion" of the CHIO Aachen, the dressage events are held in the "Deutsche Bank Stadion" and the vaulting competitions are held in the "Albert-Vahle-Halle". The first horse show were held 1924 in Aachen, together with a horse race. In 1927 the horse show lasted six days. The first show jumping Nations Cup was held here in 1929. Since 2007, influenced by the World Equestrian Games 2006 in Aachen, also eventing and vaulting are disciplines of the CHIO Aachen. In 2010 the 79th time a horse show is held in the Soers in Aachen.

2012 Olympic Qualification (show jumping) 
The Olympic Qualification competition was a jumping competition with two rounds. It was held on Sunday, July 10, 2011 at 1:00 pm in the driving stadium. Resulting of the result of this competition the best team from Central and Eastern Europe, Asia and Oceania is qualified for the 2012 Summer Olympics. Also the NOC of best rider from South East Asia or Oceania is qualified for the 2012 Summer Olympics in London. The best competitor of this competition get a Wild card for the CSIO 5*-tour of the 2011 CHIO Aachen.

Team results

(Top 6 of 8 Teams)Grey penalties points do not count for the team result.

Individual results

(Top 11 of 37 Competitors)

Nations Cup of Germany (vaulting) 
The 2011 vaulting Nations Cup of Germany was part of the 2011 CHIO Aachen and was held Sunday, July 10. It was a combined competition of three Freestyle vaulting competitions (single vaulting – Men, single vaulting – Women and team vaulting). Unlike the other disciplines nations could start with more than one team.
(Top 4 of 8 teams)

Prize of Europe (show jumping) 
The "Preis von Europa" (Prize of Europe), a competition held since 1960, was the first main competition in show jumping at the 2011 CHIO Aachen. The sponsor of this competition was the Warsteiner Brewery. It was held on Wednesday, July 13, 2011 at 2:00 pm. The competition was a show jumping competition with one round and one jump-off, the height of the fences were up to 1.55 meters. The Prize of Europe was endowed with 60,000 €.

On a rainy day seven riders had not faults with her horses in the first round. Winner of the competition is Meredith Michaels-Beerbaum with the 18-year-old darkbay gelding Shutterfly.

(Top 5 of 52 Competitors)

Grand Prix de Dressage / Nations Cup of Germany (dressage) 
The 2011 dressage Nations Cup of Germany was part of the 2011 CHIO Aachen. Unlike 2010, only the result of the Grand Prix de Dressage has count for the Nations Cup result. Each team consist of three or four team riders, three results of each team count for the Nations Cup ranking.

The sponsor of the Grand Prix de Dressage is Tesch Inkasso, the dressage Nations Cup ranking is sponsored by the Lambertz-Group.

Team result 

(grey penalties points do not count for the team result)

Individual result 

(top 5 of 37 competitors)

FEI Nations Cup of Germany (show jumping) 
The 2011 FEI Nations Cup of Germany in show jumping was part of the 2011 CHIO Aachen. It was the fifth competition of the 2011 FEI Nations Cup.

The 2011 FEI Nations Cup of Germany was held on Thursday, July 14, 2011 at 7:30 pm (second round under floodlight). The competing teams was: Ireland, Great Britain, the Netherlands, the United States of America, Denmark, Germany, Belgium and France.

The competition was a show jumping competition with two rounds and optionally one jump-off. The height of the fences were up to 1.60 meters. The Nations Cup was endowed with 220,000 €. Mercedes-Benz is the sponsor of this competition.

(grey penalties points do not count for the team result)

Grand Prix Spécial (dressage) 
The Grand Prix Spécial was one of the most important dressage competitions at the 2011 CHIO Aachen. A Grand Prix Spécial is the competition with the highest definite level of dressage competitions.

It was held on Saturday, July 16, 2011 at 8:30 am. The Meggle AG was the sponsor of this competition.

(top 5 of 30 competitors)

CICO 3* (eventing) 
The CICO 3* was the official eventing competition of Germany. It was held as two-day-event. The first part of this competition, the dressage phase, was held on Friday, July 15, 2011 at 8:30 am. The second phase, the show jumping phase, was held on the same day at 5:30 pm. The final phase, the cross country phase, was held on Saturday, July 16, 2011 at 10:30 am.

The sponsor of this competition was DHL.

team result 

(grey penalties points do not count for the team result)

individual result 

(Top 5 of 42 Competitors)

Combined individual classification (four-in-hand-driving) 
The combined individual classification is held separated from the team competition. Only the marathon phase was held together with the team competition.

The first part of this competition, the driven dressage, was held on Wednesday, May 13, 2011 at 1:00 pm. The second competition, the obstacle cone driving, was held on Friday, July 15, 2011 at 9:00 pm. The final phase, the marathon, was held on Saturday, July 16, 2011 at 2:30 pm.

(top 10 of 25 competitors)

Best of Champions 
The "Best of Champions" was a show jumping competition with two rounds and a joker obstacle after the second round. The height of the fences will be up to 1.50 meters. It will be held on Saturday, July 16, 2011 at 8:30 pm.

The competition was held in 2011 in a new mode without a horse change. Up to 2010 it was a special show jumping competition with a horse change of the four competitors. 

Since 2011 the best six women and the best six men in the FEI World Ranking have the permission to start in this competition. Also the best placed German men and women in the World Ranking can start in this competition.

(Top 5 of 14 Competitors)

Grand Prix Freestyle (dressage) 
The Grand Prix Freestyle (or Grand Prix Kür), also called the "Großer Dressurpreis von Aachen" (Grand dressage price of Aachen) was the final competition of the CDIO 5* at the 2011 CHIO Aachen. 

A Grand Prix Freestyle is a Freestyle dressage competition. The level of this competition is at least the level of a Grand Prix de Dressage, but it can be higher than the level of a Grand Prix Spécial.

The Grand Prix Freestyle at the CDIO 5* (2011 CHIO Aachen) was held on Sunday, July 17, 2011 at 10:00 am. The Deutsche Bank was the sponsor of this competition.

(top 5 of 15 competitors)

Nations Cup of Germany (four-in-hand-driving) 
The four-in-hand-driving nations cup was the official four-in-hand-driving competition of Germany. 

The first part of this competition, the driven dressage, was held on Thursday, May 14, 2011 at 10:00 am. The second competition, the marathon, was held on Saturday, July 16, 2011 at 2:30 pm. The final phase, the obstacle cone driving, was held on Sunday, July 17, 2011 at 10:00 am.

(grey penalties points do not count for the team result)

Großer Preis von Aachen (show jumping) 
The "Großer Preis von Aachen", the show jumping Grand Prix of Aachen, was the mayor show jumping competition of the 2011 CHIO Aachen. It was held on Sunday, July 17, 2011 at 3:00 pm. The competition was a show jumping competition with two round and one jump-off, the height of the fences were up to 1.60 meters. 

The main sponsor of the "Großer Preis von Aachen" was Rolex. The Grand Prix was endowed with 350,000 €.

(Top 5 of 40 Competitors)

Sport farewell of successful horses 
At Saturday evening Jos Lansink and the audience in Aachen say goodbye to the Gold-winning horse of the 2006 World Equestrian Games in Aachen, the grey Holsteiner stallion Cumano.

Also another horse hero of the 2006 World Equestrian Games had to say goodbye at the 2011 Aachen. After the victory in the "Preis von Europa" Meredith Michaels-Beerbaum decided that the sport farewell of her dark bay Shutterfly. The Hanoverian gelding say goodbye to the audience in Aachen after the showjumping Grand Prix.

Television / Live Video 
The German TV stations (WDR, ARD and ZDF) had broadcast more than 15 hours from the 2011 CHIO Aachen, most of them live. Across Europe Eurosport broadcast a two-hour summary programme of the 2011 CHIO Aachen (Show jumping nations cup and show jumping Grand Prix).

Much of the competition are streamed live by the German IPTV-channel ClipMyHorse.

References 
 :de:CHIO Aachen

External links 
 official website
 2011 results
 Live stream of much competitions

CHIO Aachen
CHIO Aachen
CHIO Aachen